There have been two baronetcies created for members of the Northcote family, one in the Baronetage of England and one in the Baronetage of the United Kingdom. One creation is extinct.

The Northcote Baronetcy, of Hayne in the County of Devon, was created in the Baronetage of England on 16 July 1641. For more information on this creation, see the Earl of Iddesleigh.

The Northcote Baronetcy, of Seamore Place in the Parish of St George, Hanover Square, in the County of Middlesex, was created in the Baronetage of the United Kingdom on 23 November 1887. For more information on this creation, see the Baron Northcote.

Northcote baronets, of Hayne (1641)
see the Earl of Iddesleigh

Northcote baronets, of Seamore Place (1887)
see the Baron Northcote

Notes

References
Kidd, Charles, Williamson, David (editors). Debrett's Peerage and Baronetage (1990 edition). New York: St Martin's Press, 1990, 

Baronetcies in the Baronetage of England
Extinct baronetcies in the Baronetage of the United Kingdom
1641 establishments in England
1887 establishments in the United Kingdom